Students for Sensible Drug Policy (SSDP) is an international nonprofit organization advocacy and education organization with focus on drug policy, war on drugs, marijuana legalization, psychedelics, juvenile justice and youth rights, drug decriminalization, criminal justice reform. SSDP promotes global youth civic engagement as a tool in reforming drug policy.

SSDP has expanded from a single chapter in upstate New York created by a handful of students to a network of over 150 chapters worldwide.

Board

SSDP is governed by a Board of Directors and a Board of Trustees, a designated body of the Board of Directors. Together, they are responsible for crafting strategy for the organization, overseeing compliance and financial affairs, and overseeing SSDP’s Executive Director. At least two-thirds of the members of SSDP's Board of Directors are students or young people elected by SSDP's chapters each year during the organization's national Congress. Maya Tatum, Arizona State University Tempe campus, is the current chair.

Main issues

Access to harm reduction 
Harm reduction is the act of mitigating negative consequences associated with drug use. SSDP provides tools for its members to advocate for the implementation of harm reduction measures and support to engage in direct service work.

Marijuana policy reform 
Students and chapters work on marijuana policy reform at the local, state, and federal levels by supporting legislation and ballot initiatives for decriminalization, medical marijuana, adult-use taxation and regulation, and social equity measures for communities disproportionately targeted by marijuana prohibition.

Psychedelic policy reform 
SSDP provides resources for its members to advocate for psychedelic policy reform, such as psychedelic therapy programs and allowing the research of currently prohibited psychedelic substances by researchers.

Ending student drug testing 
Students should not have to submit to a drug test at random or to participate in extracurricular activities.

Global drug policy 
SSDP is a member of the Economic and Social Council and thus a consultant to its functional commissions. As such, SSDP has been advocating for policy reform and youth inclusion at the Commission on Narcotic Drugs, including the 2016 Special Session of the UN General Assembly on the World Drug Problem and the High Level Ministerial Segment in 2019.

SSDP Global Drug Policy and Development Consultant, Orsi Fehér, held the office of Treasurer on the board of the Vienna NGO Committee on Drugs between 2018–2020.

SSDP's former International Program Coordinator, Jake Agliata, is a co-founder of the Paradigma Youth Coalition.

The organization also coordinates youth participation in global campaigns such as Support. Don't Punish and International Overdose Awareness Day.

Drug decriminalization 
SSDP encourages chapters to create and support campaigns to decriminalize simple drug possession and other low-level crimes associated with drug use.

"Just Say Know" drug education 
Just Say Know is a peer-to-peer drug education program, provides evidence-based drug information on campus and empowers them to reduce drug-related harm within their communities.

Campus chapters
SSDP is made up of students and community members organized on college and high school campuses across the world. In 2015–2016, SSDP chapters were on 320 campuses, included 4,312 student activists and engaged in 135 drug policy initiatives. In 2021, our movement has expanded to over 30 countries and all six habitable continents.

International 
SSDP’s international chapters engage in reform from their campus and community to the United Nations,representing the voices of youth from their countries and sharing their experiences fighting the drug war with their fellow SSDPers all over the world.

SSDP’s international network has doubled in size through 2018 and expanded its structure to include regional fellowships to represent the specific needs of the Latin American, West African and European chapters. In 2020, SSDP International was

Alumni Association 
The SSDP Alumni Association is composed of individuals who determine their own activities and levels of involvement. Individuals are organized geographically into regional SSDP Alumni Associations based on where they currently reside. However, individuals may of course participate in other regional networks by joining additional regional SSDP Facebook groups (ex: if the region you attended school is different from where you currently live).

The Deputy Director is responsible for managing the mentoring program by matching mentors and mentees, as well as training mentors on appropriate and effective mentorship.

See also
 War On Drugs
 Prohibition (drugs)
 Race and the War on Drugs
 Drugs in the United States
 Drug policy
 School-to-prison pipeline
 Harm reduction
 Good Samaritan law
 Drug decriminalization
 Cannabis legalization in the United States
 Coca eradication
 Psychedelic therapy
 Intersectionality

References

External links
 
 Official blog
 Canadian Students for Sensible Drug Policy
 SSDP Australia

Cannabis law reform organizations based in the United States
Drug policy organizations based in the United States
Drug policy reform
International student organizations
Student organizations established in 1998
Student political organizations
Student rights
501(c)(3) organizations